Sacred Blood "Divine" Lies is the 19th studio album from the rock group Magnum. The album was released on 26 February 2016. It is the last studio album of original material to feature longtime keyboardist Mark Stanway, who left the band in December 2016. The cover was painted by Rodney Matthews.

The album entered the charts at number 31 in the United Kingdom, the highest chart position there since 1992's Sleepwalking. Compared to the previous album Escape from the Shadow Garden, the album went slightly back in the European charts, charting 20 in Germany, 23 in Sweden, and 26 in Switzerland. The album also became the first Magnum record to chart in Austria, peaking at 57.

Bob Catley stated that contrary to what the name of the title track may imply, the song is not a critique of religion; rather, it criticizes cult leaders who exploit their followers' shortcomings to present themselves as superior.

Track listing

Personnel
Tony Clarkin – guitar
Bob Catley – vocals
Al Barrow – bass guitar
Mark Stanway – keyboards
Harry James – drums

References

2016 albums
Magnum (band) albums
SPV GmbH albums
Albums with cover art by Rodney Matthews